Charlie Dove (1879–?) was an English footballer.

Career
Dove was regarded as being very physically fit for a footballer; in 1895 he stood nearly 6 feet tall and weighed 12 stone, which was considered large for a sixteen-year-old from a working-class area of Essex. His main position was defender.

He played for many local teams and was a schoolboy player of some repute, winning two medals as a right back with Park School. 
Upon leaving school he joined Forest Swift Juniors as a centre forward, before moving on to captain Plaistow Melville. Dove continued to make his name at Upton Park and with South West Ham, being regarded as an exceptional talent.

Dove was an employee of Thames Ironworks and Shipbuilding Co. Ltd, working as an apprentice to the riveters and jumped at the chance to play for the newly formed Thames Ironworks in 1895. The half a crown (12½p) membership would have been a third of his weekly wage.

On 31 December 1898 Dove completed the distinction of playing in every position for the club when he deputised for goalkeeper Tommy Moore in an away game against Maidenhead. He even kept a clean sheet and the Thames Ironworks won 4–0.

Dove was an important part of the Thames team that won successive London League and Southern League Division Two titles, and one story suggests that he had a connection with the club adopting claret and blue as their colours. Charlie had apparently gotten the kits for the club at a very cheap price of £3.10s. They had come from William Belton (great-grandfather of author Brian Belton), who was a professional sprinter of national repute, as well as being one of the coaches at Thames Ironworks. During the summer of 1899, Belton had been at a fair in Birmingham, close to Villa Park, the home ground of Aston Villa. The scrawny looking Belton had been challenged to a race against four Villa players, who wagered money that one of them would win. Belton defeated them, and when they were unable to pay the bet one of the Villa players, who was responsible for washing the team's kit, offered a complete side's 'uniforms' to Belton in payment of the bet. The Aston Villa player subsequently reported to his club that the kit was 'missing'.

Dove would continue to be a major player for Thames Ironworks, and its later incarnation of West Ham United until his controversial transfer in 1901 to arch-rivals Millwall. He made 23 Southern League appearances for Millwall during the 1901–02 season, but played only three matches in 1902–03 before an injury ended his playing career. In total he made 49 appearances for Millwall.

References

External links
West Ham United statistics
Biography
Charlie Dove Photograph

1879 births
Footballers from East Ham
English footballers
Association football fullbacks
Upton Park F.C. players
Millwall F.C. players
West Ham United F.C. players
Year of death missing
Thames Ironworks F.C. players
Southern Football League players